Leucothoe fontanesiana, also known as the highland doghobble, fetter-bush, mountain doghobble or switch ivy, is a species of flowering plant in the family Ericaceae, native to the southeastern United States.

This plant is a calcifuge and requires a shaded position in acid soil. The cultivar 'Rollissonii' has gained the Royal Horticultural Society's Award of Garden Merit.

L. fontanesiana has been marked as a pollinator plant, supporting and attracting bees and butterflies

References

Vaccinioideae
Flora of the Southeastern United States
Flora of the Appalachian Mountains
Flora without expected TNC conservation status